Erda may refer to:

 Earth
 Erda, Utah
 Elastic recoil detection analysis
 Erda or Urðr, often confused with the goddess Jörð, in Richard Wagner's opera cycle Der Ring des Nibelungen (The Ring of the Nibelung)
 Energy Research and Development Administration
 El Rostro de Analía (Analia's Face), a Spanish-language telenovela produced in United States
 894 Erda